The House of Sratsimir, also Sracimir, or Sratsimirovtsi was a medieval Bulgarian dynasty that at times ruled the Tsardom of Tarnovo, the Tsardom of Vidin, the Principality of Valona and Kanina, the Despotate of Lovech, and the Despotate of Kran. Paternally, they descended from the Asen dynasty, and maternally, they descended from the Shishman dynasty.

Sratsimir
Ivan Alexander of Bulgaria (1331 – 1371)
co-emperor Michael Asen IV of Bulgaria (b. c. 1322, co-emperor 1332-1355)
Ivan Sratsimir of Bulgaria (b. 1324/1325, ruled 1356-1397 in Vidin)
Queen Dorothea of Bosnia
Constantine II of Bulgaria (b. early 1370s, ruled 1397-1422 in Vidin and in exile)
Ivan Shishman of Bulgaria (b. 1350/1351, ruled 1371-1395 in Tarnovo)
Patriarch Joseph II of Constantinople (Patriarch of Constantinople 1416-1439)
Fruzhin (d. c. 1460)
John Komnenos Asen (1332 – 1363)
Alexander Komnenos Asen (1363 – 1372)
Komnena (1372 – 1395)
Helena ( 1332–59), Queen consort of Serbia

Sources 
 

 
Bulgarian royal houses